Bossiaea brownii is a species of flowering plant in the family Fabaceae and is endemic to eastern Queensland. It is an erect shrub with egg-shaped leaves and yellow flowers with red markings.

Description

Taxonomy
Bossiaea brownii was first formally described in 1864 by George Bentham in Flora Australiensis, including from specimens collected by Robert Brown at Port Bowen.

Distribution and habitat
This bossiaea grows in woodland and forest, often in gorges and is found south from Shoalwater Bay and as far inland as Springsure in eastern Queensland.

References 

brownii
Flora of Queensland
Plants described in 1864
Taxa named by George Bentham